The Woodbury Formation is a Mesozoic geologic formation in New Jersey, United States. It primarily consists of massive dark gray clays and silts with carbonized wood fragments and pyrite, deposited in a marine setting.

The remains of the dinosaur Hadrosaurus have been recovered from this formation.

Using radio isotope dating of bivalve shells, the formation has been dated to between 80.5 and 78.5 million years ago.

See also

 List of dinosaur-bearing rock formations
 List of stratigraphic units with few dinosaur genera

References

Geologic formations of New Jersey
Campanian Stage
Cretaceous geology of New Jersey